Hypatopa ibericella is a moth in the family Blastobasidae. It is found in Spain.

References

Moths described in 2007
Hypatopa